Clues is the self-titled debut album by Clues, and its only album before disbanding in 2010. It was released on May 19, 2009 on Constellation Records., after having leaked onto the internet on April 5, 2009.

The track "Cave Mouth" quotes the melody to Jeff Buckley's "New Year's Prayer."

Track listing 
 "Haarp" – 3:23
 "Remember Severed Head" – 2:59
 "Approach the Throne" – 4:16
 "In the Dream" – 3:53
 "You Have My Eyes Now" – 4:11
 "Perfect Fit" – 3:26
 "Elope" – 5:10
 "Cave Mouth" – 3:58
 "Crows" – 3:20
 "Ledmonton" – 4:22
 "Let's Get Strong" – 3:31

Personnel 
 Alden Penner – band
 Brendan Reed – band
 Lisa Gamble – band
 Nick Scribner – band
 Thierry Amar – guest
 Noah Cannon – guest
 Nathan Gage – guest
 Ben Howden – guest
 Louisa Sage – guest
 Radwan Moumneh – recording
 Mark Lawson – recording
 Efrim Menuck – recording
 Harris Newman – recording

References

External links
 Clues on Constellation Records

2009 debut albums
Clues (band) albums
Constellation Records (Canada) albums